Alexandre José Barbosa Lima e Sobrinho (January 22, 1897 – July 16, 2000) was a Brazilian lawyer, writer, historian, essayist, journalist and politician

Sobrinho was born in Recife on January 22, 1897. In 1917 he graduated in law and social sciences in Recife. In 1926 he published his first book and was elected president of the Brazilian Press Association. He was a member of the Brazilian Academy of Letters since 1937 and, at the end of the 1990s, appeared in the Guinness World Records as the oldest active journalist in the world. Author of over 70 books, he died in 2000 at the age of 103.

References

External links 
 
 

1897 births
2000 deaths
People from Recife
Brazilian centenarians
Brazilian journalists
20th-century Brazilian lawyers
Men centenarians
20th-century journalists

Candidates for Vice President of Brazil